The Governor of the Jewish Autonomous Oblast is the head of executive branch for the Jewish Autonomous Oblast, considered as Prime Minister of the Jewish Autonomous Oblast.

The office of Governor is an elected position, for which elected officials serve four year terms. While individual politicians may serve as many terms as they can be elected to, Governors cannot be elected to more than two consecutive terms.

The official residence for the Governor is located in Birobidzhan. The current Governor is Rostislav Goldstein. He was appointed as acting governor in December 2019 and elected by popular vote in September 2020 for full five-year term.

Governors

Chairmen of Executive Committee (before 1991)
 Iosif Liberberg (1934-1936)
 Mikhail Kattel (1936-1937)
 Miron Geller (1937-1938) (acting)
 Nikolay Bigler (1938-1939) (acting)
 Mikhail Zilbershteyn (1940-1947)
 Mikhail Levitin (1947-1949)
 Lew Benkovich (1949-1955)
 F.T. Klimenko (1955-1961)
 Grigory Podgayev (1961-1962)
 Andrey Okovitov (1962-1971)
 Sergey Duvakin (1971-1985)
 Mark Kaufman (1985-1990)
 Boris Korsunsky (1990-1991)

Elections

13 September 2020

13 September 2015

External links
Government of the Jewish Autonomous Oblast  in Russian

 
Politics of the Jewish Autonomous Oblast
Jewish